Clerval is a municipality in northwestern Quebec, Canada, in the Abitibi-Ouest Regional County Municipality. It covers 101.6 km² and had a population of 364 as of the Canada 2011 Census.

The municipality was incorporated on September 12, 1927, and originally called Sainte-Jeanne-d'Arc-de-Clerval. Likely the current name, adopted in 1951, is a portmanteau from the French words claire vallée, meaning "clear valley".

In addition to Clerval itself, the municipality also includes the community of L'Île-Nepawa, located on Nepawa Island in Lake Abitibi. Nepawa comes from the Algonquin language meaning "where one camps in passing" or "large island".

Demographics
Population trend:
 Population in 2011: 364 (2006 to 2011 population change: 1.7%)
 Population in 2006: 358
 Population in 2001: 351
 Population in 1996: 356
 Population in 1991: 346

Private dwellings occupied by usual residents: 162 (total dwellings: 277)

Mother tongue:
 English as first language: 0%
 French as first language: 100%
 English and French as first language: 0%
 Other as first language: 0%

Municipal council
 Mayor: Suzanne Théberge
 Councillors: Gilles Auger, Donald Boudreau, Mario Boutin, Rock Riopel, Roger Robitaille, Nicole Therrien

References

Municipalities in Quebec
Incorporated places in Abitibi-Témiscamingue
Populated places established in 1916